Frank Barclay is a retired footballer who played as an inside forward. Barclay, who was a youth team player with Nottingham Forest, made three league appearances in the 1955–56 Scottish Second Division season for Dundee United.

References

Year of birth missing
Possibly living people
Place of birth missing (living people)
Association football inside forwards
Nottingham Forest F.C. players
Dundee United F.C. players
Scottish Football League players
Scottish footballers